AD+PD, also written as ADPD, is a green and progressive political party in Malta. The party was founded on 17 October 2020 by a merger of the two most prominent third parties in Malta, the green Democratic Alternative (AD) and the social liberal Democratic Party (PD).

History 
Talks of unification started in September 2019 by the leaders of both parties and were announced in December 2019, when both parties met up next to the memorial of Karin Grech in San Ġwann. "I had long argued for the consolidation of third party politics into the new movement the country needs" stated Timothy Alden, then leader of PD. AD Chairman Carmel Cacopardo had stated that both parties had agreed on broad strokes in principle and were working together to move forward with the movement.

In a joint article published in The Malta Independent, Timothy Alden and Carmel Cacopardo stated that AD and PD had developed on the basis of dissent against power; both parties having been formed as acts of rebellion against injustices in the Labour Party. They stated that they shared a determination to address important issues which others conveniently try to ignore, and that over the years it had been AD and PD who had been at the forefront of the struggle for a better environment, good governance, transparency and accountability.

The party was officially announced as "AD+PD" on the 1 August 2020 when both parties met and signed an agreement to begin the merger process. From then on both parties promised to function as a single entity with a transition team. On 17 October 2020, both parties merged into a single party under a transitional executive, in preparation for the first annual general meeting to be held in May 2021.

Electoral history

House of Representatives

References

External links

Political parties in Malta
Green parties in Europe
European Green Party
Political parties established in 2020
2020 establishments in Malta
Progressive parties